Events from the year 1991 in Portuguese Macau.

Incumbents
 President - Mário Soares
 Governor - Carlos Montez Melancia (until 23 April), Vasco Joaquim Rocha Vieira (starting 23 April)

 
Years of the 20th century in Macau
Macau
Macau
1990s in Macau